The 1995 Wellington City mayoral election was part of the New Zealand local elections held that same year. In 1995, elections were held for the Mayor of Wellington plus other local government positions. The polling was conducted using the standard first-past-the-post electoral method.

Background
Sitting Mayor Fran Wilde retired from the role after just one term which prompted a record thirteen candidates to run for the position. The Labour Party chose Member of Parliament for Island Bay Elizabeth Tennet as its candidate for the election. It was the last time the Labour Party was to field a mayoral candidate until 2016.

The former chairman of the now defunct Wellington Harbour Board Nigel Gould was selected as the Citizens' Association candidate, beating out shoe retailer Mark Blumsky and ratepayer advocate Jack Ruben for the nomination. Blumsky was not dissuaded and immediately declared his candidacy as an independent.

The election saw Mark Blumsky win office as Wellington's Mayor. The 1995 elections also saw the demise of the long established Citizens' Association electoral ticket. Gould finished in a disappointing fourth place for mayor and only four Citizens' endorsed candidates won seats in the council, a record low, prompting the ticket to disband soon after.

Mayoralty results
The following table gives the election results:

Ward results

Candidates were also elected from wards to the Wellington City Council.

References

Mayoral elections in Wellington
1995 elections in New Zealand
Politics of the Wellington Region
1990s in Wellington